Dorolț is a commune with 3,760 inhabitants situated in Satu Mare County, Romania. It is composed of four villages: Atea (Atya), Dara (Szamosdara), Dorolț and Petea (Pete).

Demographics
Ethnic groups (2011 census): 
Hungarians: (87.6%)
Romanians: (5.4%)
Romanies (Gypsies): (6.8%)

According to mother tongue, 95.24% of the population speak Hungarian as their first language.

References

Communes in Satu Mare County
Hungary–Romania border crossings